Sacsamarca District is one of four districts of the  Huanca Sancos Province in Peru.

Geography 
Other mountains are listed below:

Ethnic groups 
The people in the district are mainly indigenous citizens of Quechua descent. Quechua is the language which the majority of the population (94.24%) learnt to speak in childhood, 5.47% of the residents started speaking using the Spanish language (2007 Peru Census).

See also 
 Kinwaqucha
 Q'illumayu
 Wamanilla

References